Churchill Road (and its northern section as Churchill Road North) is an arterial road in the inner northern suburbs of Adelaide, Australia.

Route
Churchill Road North commences at the intersection of Port Wakefield Road and Montague Roads in Cavan and heads southwest and south to the intersection of Grand Junction and Cavan Roads. Heading directly south as Churchill Road, it travels through Kilburn and Prospect, before meeting with Torrens Road in Ovingham.

Churchill Road was previously known as Lower North Road.

Major intersections

See also

References

Roads in Adelaide